Hali may refer to:

Hali I of the Maldives (died 1268), Sultan of Maldives from 1266 to 1268
Hali II of the Maldives (died 1288), Sultan of Maldives from 1278 to 1288
a medieval Latinisation of Arabic Ali (also Haly)
 Haly Abenragel, commonly known as Hali or Hali the Arabian
 Haly Abenrudian, sometimes referred to as Hali
 Maulana Hali, the Urdu poet 
 Tamba Hali (born 1983), American football player
the modern Turkish word for carpet
 Lake Hali, the fictional lake beside Carcosa
 Hali, the name of a lake in Marion Zimmer Bradley's Darkover series
 a slang term for Halifax, Nova Scotia

See also
Haile (disambiguation)
Halie, characters in Greek mythology
Hailey (disambiguation)
Haley (disambiguation)
Halley (disambiguation)
Hayley (disambiguation)